Pekinška Patka (trans. Peking Duck) is a self-titled compilation album by the Serbian punk rock/post-punk band Pekinška Patka, released in 2006, featuring remastered recordings of all of the band's releases.

Track listing 
All tracks by Nebojša Čonkić and Sreten Kovačević except where noted. All tracks arranged by Pekinška Patka except where noted.

Notes 
 Tracks 1-16 are from Plitka poezija.
 Tracks 17-18 are from the single "Bila je tako lijepa" / "Bumba, rumba".
 Tracks 19-26 are from Strah od monotonije.

References 
 The compilation at Discogs
 The compilation at the edition official site

Pekinška Patka albums